Yan Yuan (Wade-Giles: Yen Yüan) may refer to:

 Yan Hui (disciple of Confucius), also known as Yan Yuan
 Yan Yuan (Qing dynasty), Confucian scholar
 Yanyuan County, Sichuan
 Yanyuan Subdistrict (燕园庄街道), Haidian District, Beijing